Little Falls is a town in Herkimer County, New York, United States. The population was 1,587 at the 2010 census. The town is named after falls and rapids on the Mohawk River nearby.

The town of Little Falls is bordered on the east by the separate city of Little Falls. Both town and city are east of Utica. It was formed in 1829 from the town of Herkimer.

Geography

The Mohawk River and the Erie Canal cross the central portion of the town.

North-south highways New York State Route 169 and New York State Route 170 converge on the city of Little Falls. New York State Route 5 is an east-west highway north of the Mohawk River. New York State Route 5S is an east-west highway south of the Mohawk River.

The town is surrounded by hills.

Demographics

As of the census of 2000, there were 1,544 people, 580 households, and 454 families residing in the town. The population density was 68.9 people per square mile (26.6/km2).  There were 637 housing units at an average density of 28.4 per square mile (11.0/km2). The racial makeup of the town was 98.51% White, 0.26% Black or African American, 0.06% Native American, 0.71% Asian, 0.06% from other races, and 0.39% from two or more races. Hispanic or Latino of any race were 0.26% of the population.

There were 580 households, out of which 35.9% had children under the age of 18 living with them, 65.0% were married couples living together, 7.8% had a female householder with no husband present, and 21.6% were non-families. 17.8% of all households were made up of individuals, and 8.8% had someone living alone who was 65 years of age or older. The average household size was 2.66 and the average family size was 2.98.

In the town, the population was spread out, with 25.7% under the age of 18, 6.7% from 18 to 24, 29.7% from 25 to 44, 24.2% from 45 to 64, and 13.7% who were 65 years of age or older. The median age was 39 years. For every 100 females, there were 101.8 males. For every 100 females age 18 and over, there were 103.0 males.

The median income for a household in the town was $38,875, and the median income for a family was $43,393. Males had a median income of $30,952 versus $21,065 for females. The per capita income for the town was $20,383. About 7.8% of families and 10.7% of the population were below the poverty line, including 13.3% of those under age 18 and 6.5% of those age 65 or over.

Communities and locations in the Town of Little Falls
 Jacksonburg – A hamlet located west of the city of Little Falls on NY 5S.
 Kelhi Corners – A hamlet located in the northern part of the town on NY 169.
 Paines Hollow – A hamlet located in the southern part of the town at the corner of NY 167 and NY 168.
 Wrights Corners – A hamlet located in the southern part of the town on NY 167.

In popular culture
In Dana Spiotta's 2006 novel Eat the Document, Mary Whittaker, fleeing from the law under the pseudonym Caroline, travels "ten miles west of Little Falls" (167) when seeking refuge in an underground safe-house. Along with Berry, friend and fellow traveller, Mary hitch-hikes to Little Falls, "The Big Town" (182), for an evening away from the secluded women's commune residing in the hills of Herkimer County. They eat at an unnamed Italian restaurant on Main Street, buy drinks at a bar on the Mohawk River called Waterfront, and finally spend the night at "a small, clean motel with prints of the Erie Canal on the wall" (186).

References

External links 

 Town of Little Falls official website
 Little Falls Public Library Collection on New York Heritage
  Little Falls Canal
 Little Falls Historical Society
Herkimer County Historical Society website

Utica–Rome metropolitan area
Towns in Herkimer County, New York
Populated places on the Mohawk River